Mayurpankh is a 1954 Indian film directed by Kishore Sahu. It was screened in the 1954 Cannes Film Festival, where it was nominated for the Grand Prize of the Festival. The choreography of the Kathak dance in it was by Shirin Vajifdar, a pioneering Parsi dancer. The film is in colour.

Plot
The film is in part narration by the protagonist and part dialogue. Famous British author Joan Davis goes to India with her boyfriend and encounters Ranjit Singh, a game hunter, in the jungles of India. They fall in love but Joan discovers that Ranjit is married. They meet again in Jaipur at Ranjit's palace, during Ranjit's sister's wedding and Joan meets his wife Shanti. They immediately start liking each other. Ranjit's father is a mining baron and Joan's boyfriend a mining engineer. Both of them strike a deal and Ranjit has to go to England with them. Ranjit's heart wavers and he is undecided as to which love to follow, but he eventually decides.

Cast
 Kishore Sahu as Ranjit Singh
 Sumitra Devi as Shanti
 Odette Ferguson as Joan Davis
 Reginald Jackson as William Griffith
 Jankidas (as Janki Dass)
 Seema Deo
 Ramesh Gupta
 Nirdoshi
 Abbas
 Jagdish Kanwal
 Moni Chatterjee
 Shyamlal (as Shyam)
 Indira Bansal
 Roshan Vajifdar
 Kurshid Vijifdar

Soundtrack
Music was composed by Shankar Jaikishan, lyrics written by Shailendra & Hasrat Jaipuri

References

External links

1954 films
1950s Hindi-language films
Films directed by Kishore Sahu
Films scored by Shankar–Jaikishan